Niall McCormack (born 1960 in Castlebar, County Mayo, Ireland) is an Irish painter. Since the 1980s, he exhibited in England, Italy, France, Sweden, the US, and Ireland.

Education 
McCormack is deaf from birth. In 1964, he received his special education at Mary Immaculate School for Deaf
Children run by the Daughters of the Cross of Liege in Stillorgan, South Dublin. Six years later, he was transferred to
Christian Brothers, St. Joseph's School for Deaf Boys, Cabra in North Dublin. He was one
of two first pupils to sit the Leaving Certificate examination in
1980.

He studied Architectural Drawing at Dublin Institute of Technology, Bolton Street, Dublin. He secured a place to study Art Foundation
course at Dun Laoghaire School of Art, Dublin in 1982 and was awarded a NCEA
certificate in Visual Education. In 1983, McCormack studied Fine Art Painting
at the National College of Art and Design, Dublin. He 
obtained a NCAD diploma in Painting in 1986 and a BA(Hons) degree in 1987. He was a first deaf student to study Fine Art at 
NCAD.

Career 

In 1988 McCormack taught deaf children Art on a part-time basis in his old school, Mary Immaculate School, Stillorgan for two years. He also worked from his studio in Lower Ormond Quay, Dublin.

In the same year 2002, He was asked to have a solo exhibition at the Custom House Studios, Westport, Co. Mayo. Mr John O’Donaghue, the Minister for Arts, Sports and Tourism officiated the opening of the new Arts centre where he was the first artist to have an exhibition there.

Since 2007, He has exhibited at the RHA regularly. He had four solo exhibitions in 2008, 2010, 2012 and 2015. 
In 2011, he had a solo exhibition at the Linenhall Arts Centre, Castlebar, his birthplace.

He is included in the dictionary of Living Irish Artists.

He currently lives and works in Westport, Co. Mayo. He has a black and white cat called Domino.

Solo exhibitions

2015	        "Ocular Mantra", Molesworth Gallery, 16 Molesworth Street, Dublin 2 
2012	        "New Work", Molesworth Gallery, 16 Molesworth Street, Dublin 2 
2012	        "Exhibition of Portraits", Westport Arts Festival,  Westport, Co. Mayo 
2011	        "The Incidence of Light", The Linenhall Arts Centre, Castlebar, Co. Mayo 
2010 	"Inside Out" Molesworth Gallery, 16 Molesworth Street, Dublin 2
2009  	Courthouse Gallery, Ennistymon, Co. Clare 
2008 	"Gothic Pastel" Molesworth Gallery, 16 Molesworth Street, Dublin 2
2005	        Custom House Studios Gallery, Westport, Co. Mayo, Ireland 
2002	        Custom House Studios Gallery, Westport, Co. Mayo, Ireland 
1998  	Solo show, Diorama Art Gallery, London.

Collections 

 AXA Insurance 
 Westport Town Council
 Mayo County Council
 DeafHear, Dublin
 University of Limerick
 Gallaudet University, Washington DC
 See Hear, BBC, London, England
 Leinster Society of Chartered Accountants, Dublin
 Mary Hare Grammar School, Newbury, Berkshire, England
 private collections in Ireland and abroad.

References

External links 
 Article in The Irish Times
Niall McCormack - official website
Molesworth Gallery Niall McCormack

20th-century Irish painters
21st-century Irish painters
Irish male painters
Living people
1960 births
Deaf artists
Irish deaf people
Alumni of Dublin Institute of Technology
Alumni of the National College of Art and Design
20th-century Irish male artists